is a railway station in the city of Kashiwazaki, Niigata, Japan, operated by East Japan Railway Company (JR East).

Lines

Station layout
The station consists of two ground-level opposed side platforms connected by a footbridge, serving two tracks. The station is attended.

Platforms

History
Yasuda Station opened on 10 December 1899. With the privatization of Japanese National Railways (JNR) on 1 April 1987, the station came under the control of JR East.

Passenger statistics
In fiscal 2017, the station was used by an average of 344 passengers daily (boarding passengers only).

Surrounding area

Niigata Sangyo University

See also
 List of railway stations in Japan

References

External links

 JR East station information 

Railway stations in Niigata Prefecture
Railway stations in Japan opened in 1899
Shin'etsu Main Line
Stations of East Japan Railway Company
Kashiwazaki, Niigata